This is a list of Canadian films which were released in 1979:

See also
 1979 in Canada
 1979 in Canadian television

References

1979
1979 in Canadian cinema
Canada